Margaret of Brunswick-Lüneburg (6 April 1573  7 August 1643), was a German noblewoman member of the House of Welf and by marriage Duchess of Saxe-Coburg.

Born in Celle, she was the ninth of fifteen children born from the marriage of William the Younger, Duke of Brunswick-Lüneburg and Dorothea, Princess of Denmark.

Life
In Coburg on 16 September 1599, Margaret married John Casimir, Duke of Saxe-Coburg as his second wife.

Most of the wedding guests stayed before and during the marriage festivities at Heldburg Castle. Gilded state coaches, which belonged to the dowry of her mother Dorothea, were used for the occasion; they are one of the oldest still functioning coaches in the world and currently displayed at the Veste Coburg.

John Casimir celebrated his marriage with the famous Coburg Taler: on the obverse showed a kissing couple with the inscription WIE KVSSEN SICH DIE ZWEY SO FEIN (A well kiss between two), while on the reverse, showed a nun with the inscription:  WER KVST MICH - ARMES NVNNELIN (who kiss you now, poor nun?). This nun was Anna of Saxony, his first wife, whom he repudiated and imprisoned for adultery.

John Casimir and Margaret had a happy marriage, but they had no children. After John Casimir's death in 1633 Saxe-Coburg was inherited by his brother John Ernest. Margaret returned to her homeland, Celle, where she died ten years later, aged 70. She was buried in the Stadtkirche, Celle.

Notes

References
Thomas Nicklas: Das Haus Sachsen-Coburg – Europas späte Dynastie. ed. W. Kohlhammer, Stuttgart 2003.
Carl Kiesewetter: Faust in der Geschichte und Tradition, Georg Olms ed., 1978.
Sigismund Librowicz: Der Kuss und das küssen, LIT ed. Berlin-Hamburg-Münster, 2004.

|-

Margaret
1573 births
1643 deaths
People from Celle
Margaret
Daughters of monarchs